Revathy (born 27 September 1988), known by her stage name Kadhal Sandhya, is an Indian actress who appeared in Malayalam, Tamil, Telugu and Kannada films.

Early life
She was born in the year 1988. Her father Ajith is an employee of IOB and her mother Maya is a beautician. She has an elder brother, Rahul. She attended Vidyodaya Girls Higher Secondary School, Chennai until completing Class 9.

Career
Sandhya was studying when she starred in the Tamil love story Kaadhal. The role was offered to many known actresses, including Ileana D'Cruz and then Varalaxmi Sarathkumar, but the latter's father was reluctant to let her become an actress at the time. The team then picked Saranya was in Class IX, when cinematographer Vijay Milton referred her on to Balaji Sakthivel. She was initially considered to play the heroine in the film, but finally the role was later handed to Sandhya, after the director felt Saranya looked too young.

After the success of the film Kaadhal,in  2004, she took up a Malayalam film titled Alice in Wonderland which she played as the sister of actor Jayaram.  Then came the musical romance Dishyum with Jeeva. In her third Tamil film, Vallavan, she had only a small role, and the film had only modest box office success. She also acted in Koodal Nagar with Bharath. After the success of Cycle, she shifted her focus to Malayalam cinema. She debuted as a playback singer for the film Manjal Veiyil. In 2010, she appeared in a role opposite Vishnuvardhan in the Kannada film Aptharakshaka directed by P. Vasu.

She is scheduled to appear in Tarun Gopi's forthcoming film Soodhaatam, Second Innings and Long Sight. She has been a judge on a number of reality shows including Comedy Stars and Little Stars on Asianet.

Personal life
Sandhya married Arjun, a Chennai-based IT employee, on 6 December 2015. The ceremony was held at Guruvayur Temple. The couple have a daughter, born on 27 September 2016.

Filmography

Television series

References

External links

Living people
Indian film actresses
Indian voice actresses
Actresses in Tamil cinema
1988 births
Filmfare Awards South winners
Tamil Nadu State Film Awards winners
Actresses from Kochi
Actresses in Malayalam cinema
Actresses in Kannada cinema
Actresses in Telugu cinema
21st-century Indian actresses
Actresses in Tamil television